Walk Two Moons is a novel written by Sharon Creech, published by HarperCollins  in 1994 and winner of the 1995 Newbery Medal. The novel was originally intended as a follow-up to Creech's previous novel Absolutely Normal Chaos; but, the idea was changed after she began writing it.

Plot
The novel is narrated by a 13-year-old girl named Salamanca Hiddle (Sal). She and her grandparents are from Bybanks, Kentucky, a fictional town based on Quincy, Kentucky, but they are currently renting a house in Euclid, Ohio. Sal's mother has recently left Sal's father, and Sal's grandparents are taking her on a cross-country road trip to Lewiston, Idaho to see her mother. Sal loves nature and was very close to her mother before she left. On the trip, Sal entertains her grandparents by telling a story about her friend in Euclid, Ohio, Phoebe Winterbottom, whose mother suddenly disappeared and left their family too, and about Ben Finney, with whom Sal wants to begin a romantic relationship. Throughout the book, as Sal's story unfolds and their car travels west, she reveals more details about Phoebe, and why her story reminds Salamanca of her own. The more she tells her grandparents of Phoebe's story, the more she feels like her story is less connected to Phoebe's story. When Sal reaches the Missouri River, her grandmother, or referred to as Gram, is bitten by a Cottonmouth snake. Sal reaches Coeur d'Alene while Gram suffers a stroke and has to stay in a hospital. Gramps wanted to stay with Gram, but he wanted Salamanca to reach her mother in Lewiston so he gives her his car to drive. Sal reaches Lewiston, only to find that her mother had died in a bus crash on the way there. At the end of the novel Sal and her grandpa move back to Bybanks.

Themes
The major themes in the story include the development of new relationships, dealing with grief, love, death,  cultural identity, women's roles as mothers and wives, the hardships of life, and the adventures of misunderstandings and coming to terms with reality. Creech drew on her background for many of the book's themes and images, including Sal's love of nature, her relationship with her mother, and the road trip to Idaho that frames the narrative.  In an interview, Creech said that she found the aphorism that gives the book its title ("Don't judge a man until you've walked two moons in his moccasins") in a fortune cookie.

Sharon Creech is not indigenous, though she claims a vague, Native heritage. Indigenous Americans have expressed disappointment in the stereotypical and romanticized depiction of Native Americans in Walk Two Moons. Debbie Reese on Creech's authority to write about Indigenous Americans: "She's an outsider to Native culture, trying to write a story as if she's an insider. But her story is based on outsider's writings, and outsider's understandings, and it doesn't work... the Indian content doesn't really matter. It is simply a device, or, a decoration on a story about a young girl coming to terms with life and death."

Creech on her indigenous heritage and inspiration: "My cousins maintain that one of our ancestors was an American Indian. As a child, I loved that notion, and often exaggerated it by telling people that I was a full-blooded Indian. I inhaled Indian myths...  I crept through the woods near our house, reenacting these myths, and wishing, wishing, for a pair of soft leather moccasins. (I admit --but without apology--that my view of American Indians was a romantic one.)"

Awards
In 1995, Walk Two Moons won the Newbery Medal, the United Kingdom Reading Association Award, and the United Kingdom's Children's Book Award. In 1996, it received the WH Smith Mind-Boggling Book Award. In 1997, it also won the Literaturhaus Award, Austria, and the Young Adult Sequoyah Award.

References

1994 American novels
American children's novels
Newbery Medal–winning works
Novels by Sharon Creech
Novels set in Ohio
1994 children's books